In geometry, the pentagrammic prism is one of an infinite set of nonconvex prisms formed by square sides and two regular star polygon caps, in this case two pentagrams.

It is a special case of a right prism with a pentagram as base, which in general has rectangular non-base faces. Topologically it is the same as a convex pentagonal prism.

It is the 78th model in the list of uniform polyhedra, as the first representative of uniform star prisms, along with the pentagrammic antiprism, which is the 79th model.

Geometry
It has 7 faces, 15 edges and 10 vertices. This polyhedron is identified with the indexed name U78 as a uniform polyhedron.

The triangle face has an ambiguous interior because it is self-intersecting. The central pentagon region can be considered a angel or exterior depending on how the interior is defined. One definition of the interior is the set of points that have a ray that crosses the boundary an odd number of times to escape the diameter

Gallery

Pentagrammic dipyramid

In geometry, the pentagrammic dipyramid (or bipyramid) is first of the infinite set of face-transitive star dipyramids containing star polygon arrangement of edges.  It has 10 intersecting isosceles triangle faces. It is topologically identical to the pentagonal dipyramid.

Each star dipyramid is the dual of a star polygon based uniform prism.

Related polyhedra 

There are two pentagrammic trapezohedra (or deltohedra), being dual to the pentagrammic antiprism and pentagrammic crossed antiprism respectively, each having intersecting kite-shaped faces (convex or concave), and a total of 12 vertices:

References

External links 
 
 

http://www.mathconsult.ch/showroom/unipoly/78.html
http://bulatov.org/polyhedra/uniform/u03.html
Paper model of pentagrammic prism
https://web.archive.org/web/20050313234702/http://www.math.technion.ac.il/~rl/kaleido/data/03.html
https://web.archive.org/web/20060211140715/http://www.ac-noumea.nc/maths/amc/polyhedr/no_conv5_.htm
Paper Model (net) Pentagrammic Prism

Prismatoid polyhedra
Pyramids and bipyramids